Jessie Eleanor Scarpa (born May 17, 1996) is an American professional soccer player who plays as a forward playing in Sweden's Damallsvenskan.

Club career

Washington Spirit
Scarpa made her NWSL debut on September 5, 2020.

References

External links
 
 
 

1996 births
Living people
American women's soccer players
Women's association football midfielders
Washington Spirit players
National Women's Soccer League players
North Carolina Tar Heels women's soccer players
United States women's under-20 international soccer players